"Alone Without You" is a song by English band King, released as the first single from their second studio album Bitter Sweet.

The single was the second of the band's only two top ten hits, peaking at No. 8 on the UK Singles Chart in August 1985, and remaining there for nine weeks.

Track listing
UK 7" single
A. "Alone Without You" - 3:35
B. "I Kissed the Spikey Fridge" (Rock Hard Mix) - 4:00

UK 12" single
A. "Alone Without You" (Scorcher Mix) - 4:30
B1. "Love & Pride" (USA Summer Mix) - 6:17
B2. "I Kissed the Spikey Fridge" (Rock Hard Mix) - 4:02

References

1985 songs
1985 singles
CBS Records singles
Song recordings produced by Richard James Burgess
King (band) songs